Monta Vista High School is a four-year public high school located in the Silicon Valley city of Cupertino, California, US. Part of the Fremont Union High School District, the school serves most of the suburban residential and industrial technology enriched area of western Cupertino. In 2016, Monta Vista was ranked by Newsweek as the 18th best high school in the United States.

History
Monta Vista High opened in 1969.

In 2014, a new field, track, and stadium were built along with a new student union and newly renovated cafeteria and six classrooms.

On October 27, 2014, student Ethan Justin Wong, who was riding his bike to school, collided with a haul truck, although the specifics were unclear. Wong was pronounced dead at the scene.

Notable alumni 

 Matthew Axelson  Navy Seal
 Andrew He  competitive programmer
 Angela Zhang  scientist
 Matt Arya  professional soccer player
 Amir Bashti  professional soccer player
 Dylan Fergus  actor
 Sheryl Johnson  field hockey coach, member of the US Olympic field hockey team
 Kyle Kingsbury  UFC fighter
 Andrew Martinez  "The Naked Guy" at the University of California, Berkeley
 DJ Patil  Chief Data Scientist of the United States
 Daniel Puder  MMA fighter
 Ron Reis  WCW wrestler
 Robert Rothbart  professional basketball player 
 Stephanie Sheh  voice actress
 Beth A. Simmons  professor and academic
 Vance Walberg  basketball coach
 Paul Kim (1981-) Korean American musician, singer and rapper
 Leah Thomas  professional cyclist, US Olympic road cyclist
 Zach Hsieh  YouTuber and social media influencer

Notable faculty
 Petri Hawkins-Byrd  television personality known for his role as bailiff for entire series run of 25 seasons of Judge Judy (1996-2021)

References

External links

Monta Vista High School website
School Newspaper

Educational institutions established in 1969
Fremont Union High School District
High schools in Santa Clara County, California
Public high schools in California
1969 establishments in California